The Panzerkampfwagen I Ausf. F, also known as VK 18.01, was a German light tank from World War II. Despite the fact that it was designated as a modification of the light tank Panzer I, the VK.18.01 was a completely new vehicle, had almost nothing to do with it. The Pz.Kpfw.I Ausf.F was created in 1942 as a light tank designed to storm fortified lines. In that same year, 30 units were produced (No. 150301-150330). From 1943 it was used for anti-guerrilla operations on the Eastern Front and in Yugoslavia. Thirty Ausf F tanks were built between April and December 1942, eight of which were sent to the Eastern Front for evaluation.

The Pz.Kpfw.I Ausf.F was almost the same as the Panzer II Ausf. J in terms of armor, which itself did not enter serial production.

History
Since the end of 1938, the German army leadership knew that the Panzer I no longer had any potential as a combat tank and all new developments were directed towards reconnaissance or infantry support tanks. The Panzer I Ausf. F was a completely new design that used few elements of the original Panzer I Ausf. A, B and C. It varied from the earlier Panzer I design with an increase in armour and new suspension. The design bureau called for the tank to mount the maximum armour protection possible. The Panzerkampfwagen I Ausf. F was a design intended to modify the Panzer I tank to become a light tank with heavy and thick armor (~80mm) in order to assist the infantry in the attack operations. The initial order of 30 pieces was given on December 22, 1939, at, and also produced by the manufacturer Krauss-Maffei. But an additional order of 100 pieces was cancelled even before its production began.

Description
The Panzer I Ausf. F uses the same armor layout as the Panzer II Ausf. J however it lacks one of the view ports on the upper frontal glacis plate. Its armor at the front was virtually impenetrable to anti-tank weapons at the time. It has 80mm frontal armour, 50mm on the side and rear, and 25mm top and bottom. However, the armour had little to no slope.

The engine was a Maybach HL 45P 6-cylinder delivering  into a four-speed gearbox with one reverse gear. For the Panzer I Ausf. F a special suspension (Schachtellaufwerk) had been developed with overlapping wheels and a torsion bar suspension. This allowed larger wheels and permitted use of low quality rubber which was at the time a scarce raw material in Germany on them.

For the tank commander, five episcopes had been built into the dome that gave a view to the front and sides of the tank. In addition, the commander had a visor for the two 7.92 mm MG-34 machine guns. The driver had a folding peephole at the front of one episcope on the left. A FuG 2 radio was fitted.

Production
Serial production of the tank was in 1942, a total of 30 tanks were built:

Combat use
In the 1st Panzer Division in 1943, eight tanks underwent military tests. In addition, according to some reports, as of July 1, 1943, seven vehicles were in the 12th Panzer Division. The rest of the tanks were used quite effectively in anti-guerrilla actions during the Second World War. Three tanks were captured by the Red Army.

Surviving vehicles

Currently, 2 of the vehicles survive in museums:

: The surviving vehicle was in Kubinka Tank Museum.

: Another was in Military Museum in Belgrade.

See also
Valiant - another WWII attempt at compact but heavily armoured tank

References

External links

World War II tanks of Germany
Military vehicles introduced from 1940 to 1944
Tanks introduced in 1941